The Southern Nazarene Crimson Storm volleyball team represents the Southern Nazarene University Great American Conference in Division II volleyball.  Since 1991, the team has competed in the  Sooner Athletic Conference.  Home games are played at Sawyer Center, which seats about 5,000 total, but for is typically arrange for 500.

Head coaches

Year-by-year results

References

External links